HD 5550 may refer to:

 The graphics card in the Radeon HD 5000 Series
 HR 273, a class A0 giant star in Cassiopeia